Kim So-young (born 12 June 1966) is a South Korean taekwondo practitioner. 

She won a gold medal in featherweight at the 1987 World Taekwondo Championships in Barcelona, and a gold medal in featherweight at the 1989 World Taekwondo Championships in Seoul. She won a gold medal at the 1988 Asian Taekwondo Championships in Kathmandu.

References

External links

1966 births
Living people
South Korean female taekwondo practitioners
World Taekwondo Championships medalists
Asian Taekwondo Championships medalists
Sungshin Women's University alumni
20th-century South Korean women